Whitla may refer to:

 Whitla, Alberta, Canada, an unincorporated community near Medicine Hat
 William Whitla (1851–1933), Irish physician and politician